Muna is the second solo album by Czech songwriter, musician, actress, and singer Markéta Irglová. It was released on September 23, 2014. The title of the album is the Icelandic word for "remembering". Marketa said the album is a document of spiritual searching, an album of saints, angels and psalms.

Muna features 27 musicians, utilizing full choral, string and percussion pieces, plus guests Rob Bochnik (The Frames), Iranian daf player and vocalist Aida Shahghasemi, as well as Marketa's sister Zuzi on backing vocals.

Track listing

References

2014 albums
Markéta Irglová albums